Quarkia is a genus of minute sea snails, marine gastropod mollusks or micromollusks in the family Rissoidae.

Species
Species within the genus Quarkia include:

 Quarkia sculpturata Faber, 2009

References

Rissoidae
Monotypic gastropod genera